The 2002 Selecta-PBA All-Filipino Cup Finals was the best-of-5 basketball championship series of the 2002 PBA All-Filipino Cup and the conclusion of the conference's playoffs. The Coca Cola Tigers and Alaska Aces played for the 83rd championship contested by the league.

Coca Cola Tigers wins their 1st PBA title with a 3–1 series victory over the Alaska Aces as history was made on Christmas Day with the Tigers becoming the first team to win a championship in their first season.

Series scoring summary

Games summary

Game 1

Game 2

Ato Morano pumped in 8 of his game-high 23 points in the extension period as he filled in for the Tigers' reliable scorers, Johnny Abarrientos and Jeffrey Cariaso, who were sideline by injuries they sustained in the finals and semifinals, respectively, Rudy Hatfield buried a triple barely a minute left in overtime that keyed the Tigers' breakaway, Morano's free throws made it 70–64 but Kenneth Duremdes and Don Allado converted five straight points in the final 16 seconds that kept the Aces in the game, Rob Duat could have sent the game into second overtime but his two three-pointers rattled out at the final buzzer.

Game 3

Kenneth Duremdes missed a potential game-winning shot with 4 ticks left as Coca Cola stole another overtime victory and moved the Tigers to within a win of capturing the title, the Aces were contesting what looked like a three-point shot drained by John Arigo in the last 43 seconds. Arigo's jumper could have tied the game at 60-all but referee Mario Montiel assessed the shot as only two points, giving the Tigers a one-point lead in the process, Television cameras showed Arigo's attempt was way out of the three-point line, the final count was an all-time low for a PBA championship series with the Tigers scoring only five points in the third quarter and typified the game's offensive drought in some stretches.

Game 4

Rafi Reavis led a big third quarter attack as he buried three triples, including a buzzer-beater that towed the Tigers to a 59–47 advantage entering the final period, from there, it was an all Coca Cola show with Ato Morano's hot-shooting and Rudy Hatfield, adjudged the finals MVP, battling for every possession, the Tigers cemented their place in PBA history.

Roster

Broadcast notes

References

2002
2002 PBA season
Alaska Aces (PBA) games
Powerade Tigers games
PBA All-Filipino Cup Finals